There are 30 schools in the Marlborough Region, a region of the South Island of New Zealand. The region contains rural and small-town primary schools, combined primary/secondary schools in Rai Valley and Redwoodtown, a small secondary school in Picton, and several primary schools, an intermediate school, and two large secondary schools in Blenheim. All schools are coeducational except for two secondary schools in Blenheim: Marlborough Girls' and Boys' Colleges.

In New Zealand schools, students begin formal education in Year 1 at the age of five. Year 13 is the final year of secondary education. Years 14 and 15 refer to adult education facilities.

Most of the schools in Marlborough are state schools, which are fully funded by the government. State schools cannot charge tuition fees to New Zealand citizens and those non-citizens who are entitled to live in New Zealand indefinitely (e.g. permanent residents, residence visa holders, Australian citizens and permanent residents, refugees and protected persons), although a donation is commonly requested. The only schools in the region that are not state schools are two state-integrated schools, which are former private schools with a special character based on a religious or philosophical belief that have been integrated into the state system. State-integrated schools charge "attendance dues" to cover the building and maintenance of school buildings, which are not owned by the government, but otherwise they, like state schools, cannot charge fees for tuition of domestic students but may request a donation. One of the state-integrated schools is Catholic, while the other is an evangelical Christian school. Both state and state-integrated schools can charge fees for tuition of international students. There are no private schools in Marlborough. A primary school in Koromiko closed voluntarily in December 2012 due to declining roll numbers.

Schools

The roll of each school changes frequently as students start school for the first time, move between schools, and graduate. The rolls given here are those provided by the Ministry of Education, based on figures from  The Ministry of Education institution number, given in the last column, links to the Education Counts page for each school.

Closed schools

References
General
 
 
 

Specific

Marlborough
Schools in the Marlborough Region